The São Gonçalo River is a river of Ceará state in eastern Brazil. It is a tributary of the Anil River, which it joins in São Gonçalo do Amarante, Ceará, shortly before that river flows into the Atlantic Ocean.

See also
List of rivers of Ceará

References
Brazilian Ministry of Transport

Rivers of Ceará